Juan Andres  was a 16th-century priest and mathematician known by his book on arithmetics.

Life and work 
Juan Andres was also the author of a book against Muslim religion entitled Confusion de la secta mahomatica y d'l Alcorā where he states that he was faqih of Xàtiva.

Juan Andres is the writer of the book Sumario breue d'la pratica d'la arithmetica d'todo el curso de larte mercantivol bien declarado. The book, as it is stated in the last page, was written in Zaragoza in 1514 and printed in Valencia in 1515 by the printer Joan Joffre. The book is devoted to D. Serafin, earl of La Oliva and lord of Nules and Pego.

Andres states in his book that his principal referent is Luca Pacioli (Lucas de Burgo), however he did not include nothing of algebra. Other characteristic of the book is that, contrary of other Spanish scholastic who considered usury the interest rate, Andres considers that arithmetic and well done accounting is in benefit of trade, providing it with honesty and safety.

References

Bibliography

External links 
 
 

16th-century Spanish people
16th-century Spanish mathematicians